Daniel Marian Vanghelie (born 1968 in Bucharest, Romania) is a Romanian politician, the former mayor of the 5th Sector of Bucharest (2000–2016) and a former member of the Romanian Social Democratic Party (PSD). He ran for a fifth term in 2016 as an independent but was defeated by social-democratic candidate Daniel Florea. Vanghelie came in 3rd place, receiving fewer votes than both the social democratic candidate and the liberal candidate, Ovidiu Raețchi.

Due to allegations of corruption made against him by the Romanian PNA, Vanghelie was excluded from the Romanian Social Democratic Party (PSD) before the Bucharest 2004 local elections. Running at the time as an independent candidate, Vanghelie was the only of the six Bucharest district mayors to win from the first round, at a comfortable 27% margin. Following his electoral victory, he was re-accepted in PSD, although his National Anticorruption Directorate files were not closed. Vanghelie's return into the Social Democratic Party (PSD) brought up to two the number of district mayoral seats the PSD held to in Bucharest.

Best described as a populist, Vanghelie started his center-stage political career in the year 2000, when he was elected mayor in the same sector. Although he was not particularly well-known, Vanghelie made a name for himself through his populism. He promotes himself as a tell-it-like-it-is, if not particularly well-educated everyman, out to help the simple people. One of Vanghelie's most famous publicity stunts is the New Year's Celebrations the Fifth Sector Mayor's Office organizes every year, very popular with many of the residents of the sector, which has the lowest average income in Bucharest.

The slogan used by Adriean Videanu against him in the Bucharest 2005 mayor elections was count on the one who counts, a catch-phrase meant to disparage Vanghelie's lower-class background and lack of formal education. Vanghelie did provoke a measure of public concern when he was unable to conjugate the verb a fi (to be) on national television, earning him the derisive nickname "Vanghelie Care Este" (Vanghelie Who Is).

In 2008 he had General Iacob Lahovary's remains removed from his tomb at Bellu Cemetery; Vanghelie's grandfather, Constantin Niculae, was buried there, instead.

In May 2021, Vanghelie was sentenced by the Bucharest Tribunal to 11 years and 8 months for corruption. The judge decided to convict Vanghelie for each of the three charges brought against him: bribery, abuse of office, and money laundering.

Vanghelie and his wife Charlotte have a son, Alexandru (b. 1994). He has a half-brother, Paul. His parents divorced when Vanghelie was a young boy and his father, who is Jewish, emigrated to Israel, where he is a businessman.

References
  Povestea lui Vanghelie, un primar de nota 5 ("Vanghelie's story, a D mayor")

Mayors of the sectors of Bucharest
Politicians from Bucharest
Social Democratic Party (Romania) politicians
1968 births
Living people
Jewish Romanian politicians
Romanian politicians convicted of corruption